John Mazur (born June 1, 1954) is a Canadian former professional ice hockey player.

Career 
During the 1977–78 season Mazur played one game in the World Hockey Association (WHA) with the Houston Aeros.

References

External links

1954 births
Living people
Baltimore Clippers (SHL) players
Canadian ice hockey left wingers
Flin Flon Bombers players
Fort Worth Texans players
Houston Aeros (WHA) players
Ice hockey people from Winnipeg
St. Boniface Saints (ice hockey) players
Winston-Salem Polar Twins (SHL) players